DXMX (105.9 FM) was a radio station owned and operated by Oriental Mindoro Management Resources Corporation. Its studios were located at Doors 4 and 5, RJ Homes Bldg., Pelayo St., Davao City.

History

2000 - 2013: Mix FM
The station was established in 2000 by former Magic 89.9 personality and current head of the Philippine Broadcasting Service Rizal "Bong" Aportadera, Jr. (known on-air as "Sonny B") and Randall Ong as Red Hot Mix FM 105.9. Aportadera once served as city information officer at Davao City's local government. In 2005, the "Red Hot" was eventually dropped and it was simply known as "105.9 Mix FM". On that same year, Mix FM became the number one radio station in the city.

In addition, Mix FM added legendary Los Angeles radio disc jockey Rick Dees, who hosts the Rick Dees' Weekly Top 40 countdown. Also, the station hosting several events in DC such as House Party and Sikat!.

On February 28, 2013, after 13 years of existence, Mix FM signed off for the last time at 10:59pm. Its last song was "Keeping the Dream Alive" by Münchener Freiheit.

2013 - 2014: Power FM
On March 1, 2013, under new management, the station was relaunched as Power FM and switched to a news and music format. Dubbed as "The all in one station", it featured news & commentaries in the morning, music during mid-morning to evenings & blocktimers during the rest of the day.

Power FM ranked #4 in Davao City, based on the recent Kantar Media Radio Research Council Survey. As a result, the management decided to make some changes. On February 28, 2014, Power FM made its final broadcast.

2014 - 2016: Balita FM

On March 1, 2014, the station rebranded as Balita FM and added more news & talk programs. It faced competition with Radyo5, Brigada News FM and Radyo ni Juan.

On October 1, 2016, Balita FM went off the air for unknown reasons. Its former studio is currently used by Davao City Disaster Radio, owned by the Davao City LGU.

Awards
KBP Golden Dove Awards - People's Choice for Best FM Station (Mindanao Category) (2005)

References

External links

105.9 Mix FM
Radio stations established in 2000
Radio stations disestablished in 2016
Defunct radio stations in the Philippines